The Detroit Cobras are an American garage rock band from Detroit, Michigan, which was formed around 1994 by vocalist Rachel Nagy and guitarist Mary Ramirez, with a constantly changing assortment of (mostly male) sidemen. Nagy died on January 14, 2022.

History
The Detroit Cobras signed with Sympathy for the Record Industry and released their first album, Mink, Rat or Rabbit, in 1998. After a three-year gap, they released a second album, Life, Love and Leaving. The two albums consisted entirely of cover versions of songs from the 1950s, 1960s, with the exception of the Detroit Cobras version of “Bad Man” (done by the Cobras as “Bad Girl”) written by Greg Cartwright in the mid 1990s. In 2001, they were one of thirteen Michigan-based bands featured on Jack White's Sympathetic Sounds of Detroit compilation album: the Detroit Cobras' contribution was a cover of Otis Redding's "Shout Bamalama."

Their retro-garage rock formula proved popular in the UK and prompted the London-based Rough Trade Records to sign the band. They released an EP, Seven Easy Pieces, in 2003 and their third album, Baby, in 2004. Baby broke with the Cobras' tradition in that it included one original song, "Hot Dog (Watch Me Eat)". Baby was picked up for release in the US by Bloodshot (who added the songs from the Seven Easy Pieces EP to the end of Baby. In April 2007, Bloodshot released the band's fourth album, Tied & True.

The band was known for multiple line-up changes, although the band consistently fielded the classic rock and roll instrumental configuration of rhythm guitar (always played by Ramirez), lead guitar, bass and drums. Nagy and Ramirez generally had a touring line-up different from their recording line-up. Greg Cartwright of Reigning Sound (aka Greg Oblivian of The Oblivians) proved to be an especially prolific collaborator.  Perhaps their most famous sideman was Don Was, who was their bassist for one gig in 2008.

In the summer of 2008, The Detroit Cobras went on tour in support of X on their 13x31 tour. For the summer of 2009, The Detroit Cobras headlined a tour with the Dex Romweber Duo in support.  The band apparently stopped touring for several years after that, although they always played a few gigs every year, usually near Detroit but sometimes farther afield. In May and June 2014, they went on an extended tour of the Midwest and the West Coast.  In April 2018, they traveled to Europe (for the first time since 2004) to play two festivals in Germany and Spain, which led to an extended European tour in October and November 2019. A US tour was planned for 2020 but canceled because of the COVID-19 pandemic. Another tour was planned for 2022.

Nagy died on January 14, 2022, in New Orleans.  News reports gave widely varying ages immediately following her death, ranging from her late 30s to her late 50s, but she was in fact 48 years old (born December 15, 1973).

In August 2022, Ramirez reunited the band for one show only at the Magic Stick in Detroit.  Marcus Durant (formerly of Zen Guerilla) filled in as the guest vocalist. 

The Rachel Nagy celebration show in Detroit in late August 2022 went so well that the remaining members of her band — co-founder Mary Ramirez (guitar), Steve Nawara (guitar), Dale Wilson (bass), and Kenny Tudrick (drums) — are reuniting to perform a tribute set with a string of west coast dates.⁠

Members

Current line-up
Marcus Durant – lead vocals
Mary Ramirez – guitar (also known as Mary Cobra and Maribel Restrepo)
Steve Nawara –  guitar 
Dale Wilson  – bass 
Kenny Tudrick  – drums

Former members

Guitarists
Steve Shaw
Soup
Dante Adrian White
Dan Meister
Greg Cartwright
Mike "Hadji" Hodgkiss
Eddie Baranek
Reuben Glazer 
Brad Meinerding
Joey Mazzola (also bass)

Bassists
Jeff Meier
Rob Smith
John Szymanski
Matt O'Brien
Jim Diamond
Eddie Harsch
Ko Melina
Carol Schumacher
Gina Rodriguez
Jake Culkowski

Drummers 
Nick Lucassian (also bass)
Vic Hill
Chris Fachini
Damian Lang
Dave Shettler
Skeeto Valdez
Tony DeCurtis
Dave Vaughn
Johnny "Bee" Badanjek
Richie Wohlfeil

Discography

Albums and EPs
Mink, Rat or Rabbit - LP, CD, MP3 (1998, Sympathy for the Record Industry; reissued 2004 and 2016)
Life, Love and Leaving - LP, CD (2001, Sympathy for the Record Industry, Rough Trade; reissued 2004, Sinnamon Records, Rough Trade)
Life, Love and Leaving - remastered CD, MP3 (2016, Third Man)
Seven Easy Pieces (EP) - CD (2003, Rough Trade)
Baby - LP, CD, MP3 (2004, Rough Trade, Sinnamon Records; reissued 2005, Rough Trade)
Baby - Enhanced CD (2005, Bloodshot, BS 125 - includes Seven Easy Pieces and video of Cha Cha Twist)
Tied & True - LP, CD (2007, Rough Trade, Bloodshot, Fiveman Army; reissued 2011 Bloodshot)

Compilations
Bankstock II - CD (1995, 44 Caliber Records, RFD 2301) recorded at the Old Miami, in Detroit, July 4 weekend, 1995
The Original Recordings (Singles and Unreleased 1995-1997) - LP, CD, vinyl 7" Box Set (2008, Munster Records)

Singles
"Village of Love" / "Marie Christina" - vinyl 7" (1996, Human Fly)
"Over to my House" / “Down In Louisiana”- vinyl 7" (1996, Black Mamba)
"Ain't It a Shame" / "Slum Lord" - vinyl 7" (1996, Scooch Pooch)
"Cha Cha Twist" / "Hey Sailor" - vinyl 7" (2004, Rough Trade, RTRADS189)
"Cha Cha Twist" / "The Real Thing" / video of "Cha Cha Twist" - Enhanced CD,(2004, Rough Trade, RTRADSCD189)
"Cha Cha Twist" - promo CD, (2004, Rough Trade, RTRADSCDP189 - cover Transcript: "Detroit Cobras, Live at Ulu, Wed 8th Sept")
"Ya Ya Ya (Looking for My Baby)" / "As Long As I Have You" - vinyl 7" (2008, Stag-O-Lee)
"Feel Good" - digital single (2015, iTunes)
"What More" / "I Can't Go Back" - vinyl 7" - digital single (2018, Third Man Records, TMR579)

References

External links
 
 

Garage rock groups from Michigan
Bloodshot Records artists
Garage punk groups
Indie rock musical groups from Michigan
Musical groups established in 1994
Musical groups disestablished in 2022
Musical groups from Detroit
Rough Trade Records artists
Sympathy for the Record Industry artists
1994 establishments in Michigan
2022 disestablishments in Michigan
Third Man Records artists